Lin Tai-yi (April 1, 1926 – July 2003) was a Chinese-American writer and translator. She was also known as Anor Lin or Lin Wu-Shuang.

The daughter of Lin Yutang, she was born in Beijing and came to the United States with her family when she was ten. Lin was educated at Columbia University. She taught Chinese at Yale. She married Richard Ming Lai, a Hong Kong official and the couple moved to Hong Kong. Lin was the Editor-in-Chief for the Hong Kong Reader's Digest from 1965 to 1988. She also wrote for various magazines. Lin and her family moved to Washington, D.C. in 1988.

She wrote her first novel War Tide (1943) at the age of 17.

Her sister Adet Lin was also a writer. The two sisters translated Girl Rebel, the autobiography of Xie Bingying.

Selected works 
 Our Family, autobiography (1939) with Adet Lin and Mei Mei Lin
 Dawn over Chungking, autobiography (1941) with Adet Lin
 War Tide, novel (1943)
 The Golden Coin, novel (1946)
 The Eavesdropper, novel (1959)
 The Lilacs Overgrow, novel (1960)
 Kampoon Street, novel (1964)

References 

1926 births
2003 deaths
20th-century American novelists
20th-century American translators
American emigrants to Hong Kong
American women journalists
Columbia University alumni
Hong Kong novelists
20th-century journalists
Yale University faculty
20th-century American women writers
American women academics
21st-century American women